Sceau-Saint-Angel is a commune in the Dordogne department in Nouvelle-Aquitaine in southwestern France.

Geography
The Lizonne has its source in the commune.

Population

See also
Communes of the Dordogne département

References

Communes of Dordogne